The 1990-91 Division 1 season was the 27th of the competition of the first-tier football in Senegal.  The tournament was organized by the Senegalese Football Federation.  ASC Port Autonome won the second title and participated in the 1992 African Cup of Champions Clubs the following year.  ASC Diaraf participated in the 1992 CAF Cup, ASEC Ndiambour in the 1992 CAF Winners' Cup and ASC Jeanne d'Arc in the 1992 West African Cup.

SEIB Diourbel was the defending team of the title.  A total of 16 clubs participated in the competition.  The season featured 450 matches and scored 429 goals.  No new clubs came from the second division (Division 2).

Participating clubs

 US Gorée
 SEIB Diourbel
 ASC Port Autonome
 Dialdiop SC
 AS Douanes
 ASC Jeanne d'Arc
 Casa Sports
 US Ouakam

 SIDEC Dakar
 ASC Diaraf
 Stade de Mbour
 US Rail
 ASC Linguère
 ETICS Mboro
 ASC Mbosse Kaolack
 ASEC Ndiambour

Overview
The league was contested by 14 teams with ASC Port Autonome winning the championship.

League standings

Footnotes

External links

Senegal
Senegal Premier League seasons